
Hans Källner (9 October 1898 – 18 April 1945) was a German general during World War II and a recipient of the Knight's Cross of the Iron Cross with Oak Leaves and Swords. Källner was killed in action while visiting the front lines near Olomouc.

Awards
 Iron Cross (1914) 2nd Class (3 September 1917) & 1st Class (4 August 1918)
 Clasp to the Iron Cross (1939) 2nd Class (19 September 1939) & 1st Class (18 October 1939)
 German Cross in Gold on 18 October 1941 as Oberstleutnant in Aufklärungs-Abteilung 11
 Knight's Cross of the Iron Cross with Oak Leaves and Swords
 Knight's Cross on 3 May 1941 as Oberst and commander of the Schützen-Regiment 73
 Oak Leaves on 12 February 1944 as Generalmajor and commander of the 19. Panzer-Division
 Swords on 23 October 1944 as Generalleutnant and commander of the 19. Panzer-Division

References

Citations

Bibliography

 
 
 

1898 births
1945 deaths
Lieutenant generals of the German Army (Wehrmacht)
German Army personnel of World War I
German Army personnel killed in World War II
Recipients of the Gold German Cross
Recipients of the Knight's Cross of the Iron Cross with Oak Leaves and Swords
People from Katowice
People from the Province of Silesia
Prussian Army personnel
20th-century Freikorps personnel
German Army generals of World War II